Santa Justa (English: Saint Justa) is a former civil parish (freguesia) in the city and municipality of Lisbon, Portugal. It has a population of 700 inhabitants and a total area of 0.24 km². At the administrative reorganization of Lisbon on 8 December 2012 it became part of the parish Santa Maria Maior.

References 

Former parishes of Lisbon